Qom Tappeh (also known as Ghom Tppaeh, Kum Tapa, Kum Tepe, Oom Tappeh, Qūm Tapeh, and Qūm Tappeh) is a village in Chelleh Khaneh Rural District, Sufian District, Shabestar County, East Azerbaijan Province, Iran. At the 2006 census, its population was 622, in 153 families.

References 

Populated places in Shabestar County